The 1988 Tipperary Senior Hurling Championship was the 98th staging of the Tipperary Senior Hurling Championship since its establishment by the Tipperary County Board in 1887. The championship began on 14 August 1988 and ended on 8 October 1988.

Cappawhite were the defending champions, however, they failed to qualify after being defeated in the West Tipperary Championship.

On 8 October 1988, Loughmore-Castleiney won the championship after a 2-07 to 1-08 defeat of Borris-Ileigh in a final replay at Semple Stadium. It was their first ever championship title.

Qualification

Results

Quarter-finals

Semi-finals

Final

Championship statistics

Top scorers

Top scorers overall

Top scorers in a single game

Miscellaneous

 Loughmore-Castleiney win their first senior title.

References

External link

 1988 County final programme

Tipperary
Tipperary Senior Hurling Championship